Sanpasaurus ("Sanpa lizard") is a poorly known sauropod dinosaur from the Early to Late Jurassic of Sichuan, China. The type species, S. yaoi, was described by Chung Chien Young, in 1944. The type remains, IVPP V.156, consists of 20 vertebrae, scapulae, forelimbs, and some hindlimb bones.
Initially reported by Young as an ornithopod ornithischian, this specimen was unambiguously referred to Sauropoda in 2016 by McPhee et al., later refined to a basal gravisaurian position by Pol et al. in 2020 and 2022, closely related to Vulcanodon and Tazoudasaurus. Sanpasaurus is known from remains recovered from the Maanshan Member of the Ziliujing Formation.

References

Early Jurassic dinosaurs of Asia
Sauropods
Taxa named by Yang Zhongjian
Fossil taxa described in 1944
Paleontology in Sichuan